Clifford Enosoregbe (born 19 October 1990) is a Nigerian former professional tennis player.

Born in Edo State, Enosoregbe started out in tennis as a ballboy and developed an interest from there. He was member of the Nigeria Davis Cup team between 2013 and 2017, registering wins in five singles rubbers. At the 2011 All-Africa Games in Maputo he teamed up with Onyeka Mbanu to win a doubles gold medal in an all Nigerian final. He was the year-end Nigerian number one on multiple occasions.

ITF Futures titles

Doubles: (1)

References

External links
 
 
 

1990 births
Living people
Nigerian male tennis players
Sportspeople from Edo State
Competitors at the 2011 All-Africa Games
African Games medalists in tennis
African Games gold medalists for Nigeria